Drew Kerr (born December 16, 2004) is an American soccer player who plays as a midfielder for North Carolina FC in USL League One and North Carolina FC U23 in USL League Two.

Youth and college career
Kerr began playing in the North Carolina FC academy system in 2016.

He committed to join Duke University in 2022 to play college soccer with the men's soccer team.

Club career
In March 2021, he signed an academy contract with the North Carolina FC first team in USL League One in 2021, while a high school sophomore. He signed a second academy contract with the pro team the following year. During the summers of 2021 and 2022, he played with their pre-professional side North Carolina FC U23 in the fourth tier USL League Two. He made his professional debut with North Carolina FC in USL League One on October 1 against Toronto FC II.

Personal
He is the son of Duke Blue Devils men's soccer coach John Kerr Jr.

References

External links

2004 births
Living people
People from Hillsborough, North Carolina
American soccer players
American people of Scottish descent
American people of Canadian descent
Association football midfielders
USL League One players
USL League Two players
North Carolina FC players
North Carolina FC U23 players